Flatland is a 2019 South African drama film directed by Jenna Bass. It was screened in the Contemporary World Cinema section at the 2019 Toronto International Film Festival. Examining  race, gender and class in contemporary South Africa, it is part road movie, part Western and, within its noir sensibility, speaks with intelligence and kindness of its three central women characters.

Plot
In the arid Karoo, the shy and innocent Natalie marries the young policeman Bakkies, equally inexperienced and uncertain. His maladroit effort at consummation leads her to grab his revolver and flee to her beloved horse, that is stabled beside the pastor's house. When the pastor ferociously orders her to return to her husband, she shoots him dead and rides off into the desert. Calling on her heavily pregnant friend Poppie, she takes her off on a quest to find Branco, a trucker who is the father of the imminent child.

Meanwhile, the police officer Beauty drives up from Cape Town into the desert to see her husband Billy, who is serving 15 years for murdering his brother and is suspected of breaking out to kill the pastor. Beauty quickly ascertains that the suspicion is false, but Billy seems to want another sentence. 

After Natalie and Poppy find Branco at a roadside bar run by Theunis, the four agree to head for Johannesburg. When the road is blocked by snow, Branco seduces Natalie, who responds to his practiced approach, while Theunis tries to rape Poppie. He is stopped at gunpoint by Beauty, who has been trailing the two girls and takes the pair back in handcuffs. She does a deal with the local police: she will give them Natalie, who in panic killed the pastor, and they will hand Billy into her custody.

Natalie is restored to her ungrateful husband, Poppie's labour pains start, while Billy eventually agrees to escape across the frontier and start a new life with Beauty.

Cast
Faith Baloyi as Captain Beauty Cuba
Nicole Fortuin as Natalie 
Izel Bezuidenhout as Poppie
De Klerk Oelofse as Sergeant Bakkies Bezuidenhout 
Albert Pretorious as Theunis
Clayton Evertson as Branko
Brendon Daniels as Billy
Eric Nobbs as Jaap Bezuidenhout, father of Bakkies
Maurice Carpede as Reverend Salmon

Reception
On the review aggregation website Rotten Tomatoes, Flatland has  approval rating based on  reviews.

References

External links
 

2019 films
2019 drama films
South African drama films
Afrikaans-language films
Feminist films
2010s drama road movies
2010s female buddy films